Azinhal is a freguesia (parish) in the municipality of Castro Marim (Algarve, Portugal).

References

Freguesias of Castro Marim